Canyon High School is a public high school located in the city limits of Canyon, Texas (USA) and classified as a 4A school from 2018 by the UIL. It is part of the Canyon Independent School District located in north central Randall County.  In 2015, the school was rated "Met Standard" by the Texas Education Agency.

Athletics
The Canyon Eagles compete in these sports - 

Cross Country, Volleyball, Football, Basketball, Powerlifting, Swimming, Soccer, Wrestling, Golf, Tennis, Track, Softball and Baseball

State Titles
Boys Basketball - 
1950(1A), 1964(2A)
Girls Basketball - 
1969(3A), 1972(3A), 1974(3A), 1977(3A), 1978(3A), 1981(4A), 1992(3A), 1996(4A), 2000(4A), 2003(3A), 2004(3A), 2005(3A), 2007(3A), 2008(3A), 2011(4A), 2014(4A), 2015(5A), 2016(5A), 2017(5A), 2021(4A)
Boys Cross Country - 
1987(4A), 1993(3A), 1994(4A), 1995(4A), 2022(4A)
Girls Cross Country - 
1989(3A), 1990(3A), 1991(3A), 1992(3A), 1993(3A), 2003(3A), 2004(3A), 2006(3A), 2018(4A), 2019(4A)
Girls Track - 
1976(3A), 1977(3A), 1978(3A), 2005(3A)
Team Tennis - 
1991(3A), 1992(3A), 2007(3A)
One Act Play - 
1964(2A)

References

External links
Canyon ISD

Schools in Randall County, Texas
Public high schools in Texas
Canyon Independent School District